The SsangYong Torres is a Mid-size crossover SUV produced by SsangYong Motor since 2022. Sharing the same platform with the Korando, the model is positioned between the Korando and Rexton and features a rugged off-road styling. It was released in June 2022, while a battery electric variant will be released in 2023 with planned exports to Europe.

The vehicle is named after the Torres del Paine National Park in the Chilean Patagonia, South America.

Overview

Torres EVX
The Torres EVX (formerly known as the U100 project) is the electric version of the Torres, which will debut on March 30 at the 2023 Seoul Motor Show, along with a large number of concepts and production vehicles.

The model looks different from its ICE-powered counterpart thanks to the redesigned front fascia, which is an evolution of the 'Powered by Toughness' design language specific to electric vehicles.

References

External links 

 

Torres
Cars introduced in 2022
Compact sport utility vehicles
Crossover sport utility vehicles
Front-wheel-drive vehicles
All-wheel-drive vehicles